João Manuel Miguel (born 27 July 1952) is a Portuguese former amateur boxer. He competed in the men's light flyweight event at the 1980 Summer Olympics losing to the European champion who would eventually win the tournament, Shamil Sabirov.

References

External links
 

1952 births
Living people
Portuguese male boxers
Olympic boxers of Portugal
Boxers at the 1980 Summer Olympics
Sportspeople from Almada
Light-flyweight boxers